Alonella is a genus of Chydoridae.

The genus was described in 1862 by Michael Sars.

It has cosmopolitan distribution.

Species:
 Alonella brachycopa Brehm, 1931
 Alonella breviceps Stingelin, 1905
 Alonella clathratula G.O. Sars, 1896
 Alonella dadayi Birge, 1910
 Alonella excisa (Fischer, 1854)
 Alonella exigua (Lilljeborg, 1853)
 Alonella nana (Baird, 1843)
 Alonella propinqua Smith, 1909
 Alonella pulchella Herrick, 1884
 Alonella qranulata Brehm, 1933

References

Cladocera